Direct Fusion Drive (DFD) is a conceptual low radioactivity, nuclear-fusion rocket engine designed to produce both thrust and electric power for interplanetary spacecraft. The concept is based on the Princeton field-reversed configuration reactor invented in 2002 by Samuel A. Cohen and is being modeled and experimentally tested at Princeton Plasma Physics Laboratory, a US Department of Energy facility. It is also modeled and evaluated by Princeton Satellite Systems. As of 2018, the concept entered Phase II, a simulation phase, to further advance the design.

Principle

The Direct Fusion Drive (DFD) is a conceptual fusion-powered spacecraft engine named for its ability to produce thrust from nuclear fusion without going through an intermediary electricity-generating step. The DFD uses a magnetic confinement and heating system, fueled with a mixture of helium-3 and deuterium (D or ), to produce a high specific power, variable thrust and specific impulse, and a low-radiation spacecraft propulsion system. 

Nuclear fusion happens when two or more atomic nuclei, combine to form one or more atomic nuclei or sub-atomic particles. This process releases energy due to the mass of the products being lower than the initial mass of the reacting nuclei.  

In the DFD a hot (100 keV ) plasma, a collection of electrically charged particles that includes electrons and ions, fu together, releasing enormous amounts of energy. In the DFD system, the plasma is confined in a torus-like magnetic field inside of a linear solenoidal coil and is heated by a rotating magnetic field to relevant fusion temperatures.s. Bremsstrahlung and synchrotron radiation emitted from the plasma are captured and converted to electricity for communications, spacecraft station-keeping, and maintaining the plasma's temperature. This design uses a specially shaped radio frequency (RF) "antenna" to heat the plasma. The design also includes a rechargeable battery or a deuterium-oxygen auxiliary power unit to startup or restart DFD.

The captured radiated energy heats to  a He-Xe fluid that flows outside the plasma in a boron-containing structure. That energy is put through a closed-loop Brayton cycle generator to transform it into electricity for use in energizing the coils, powering the RF heater, charging the battery, communications, and station-keeping functions.

Thrust generation
Adding propellant to the edge plasma flow results in a variable thrust and specific impulse when channeled and accelerated through a magnetic nozzle; this flow of momentum past the nozzle is predominantly carried by the ions as they expand through the magnetic nozzle and beyond, and thus, function as an ion thruster.

Development

The construction of the experimental research device and most of its early operations were funded by the US Department of Energy. The recent studies—Phase I and Phase II—were funded by the NASA Institute for Advanced Concepts (NIAC) program. A series of articles on the concept were published between 2001 and 2008; the first experimental results were reported in 2007. Numerous studies of spacecraft missions (Phase I) were published, beginning in 2012. In 2017 Princeton Satellite Systems reported that "Studies of electron heating with this method have surpassed theoretical predictions, and experiments to measure ion heating in the second-generation machine are ongoing."

As of 2018, the concept has moved to Phase II, a simulation phase, to further advance the design. The full-size unit would measure approximately 2 m in diameter and 10 m long. PSS reported that electron heating in PFRC-2 surpassed theoretical predictions, reaching 500 eV with pulse lengths of 300 ms. Ion heating experiments are ongoing as of 2020.

Stephanie Thomas is vice president of Princeton Satellite Systems and the principal investigator for the Direct Fusion Drive.

Projected performance

Princeton Satellite Systems estimate that the Direct Fusion Drive could be capable of producing between 5-10 Newtons thrust per each MW of generated fusion power, with a specific impulse (Isp) of about 10,000 seconds and 200 kW available as electrical power. Approximately 35% of the fusion power goes to thrust, 30% to electric power, 25% lost to heat, and 10% is recirculated for the RF heating.

Since DFD provides power as well as propulsion in one integrated device, it would also provide as much as 2 MW of power to the payloads upon arrival, expanding options for instrument selection and laser/optical communications, and even transfer up to 50 kW of power from the orbiter to the lander through a laser beam operating at 1080 nm wavelength.

Princeton Satellite Systems believes that this technology can expand the science capability of planetary missions. This dual power/propulsion technology has been suggested to be used on a Pluto orbiter and lander mission, as well as integration on the Orion spacecraft to transport a crewed mission to Mars in a faster timeframe (4 months instead of 9 with current technology). DFD is projected to deliver scientific payloads to Titan in 2.6 years.

See also 

 Fusion Industry Association

References

External links
Princeton Satellite Systems Inc Direct Fusion Drive technical animation

Emerging technologies
Ion engines
Magnetic propulsion devices
Nuclear spacecraft propulsion
Plasma physics
Spacecraft propulsion